Tread Softly Stranger is a 1958 British crime drama directed by Gordon Parry and starring Diana Dors, George Baker and Terence Morgan. The film was shot in black-and-white in film noir style, and its setting in an industrial town in northern England mirrors the kitchen sink realism movement coming into vogue in English drama and film at the time. The screenplay was adapted from the stage play Blind Alley (1953) by Jack Popplewell.

Plot
The action takes place in the Yorkshire steel town of Rawmarsh/Parkgate – Rotherham was used for the extensive location filming – to which native son Johnny Mansell (George Baker) has fled after racking up large gambling debts in London. Johnny moves into a cramped flat with his brother Dave (Terence Morgan), a clerk in a local steel mill; Dave's girlfriend Calico (Diana Dors), a hostess in a local nightclub, lives close by and their flats have neighbouring flat roof spaces which they often use.  Calico comes up with a plan for the brothers to rob the payroll at Dave's workplace to steal enough money to cover Dave's fraud and Johnny's debts.

Cast

Production
Dors made the film after starring in a number of movies in the US.

It was shot at Walton Studios in Walton-on-Thames.

Reception
Tread Softly Stranger did reasonable business at the box-office on its original release but received little critical attention, being seen as a typical crime potboiler which would be watched once and then forgotten.  Its reputation was upgraded in later decades, with critics finding much to admire, particularly the cinematography by Douglas Slocombe with its authentic feel of everyday life in a steel town of the era. The main incongruity in the film is cited as the noticeable lack of Yorkshire accents in characters who were supposedly born and brought up in the area. It is also questionable whether a town such as Rawborough in the 1950s would have been the venue for a nightclub of the type in which Calico is employed, a far cry from the working men's club it purports to be.

The eponymous theme tune was sung by Jim Dale.

Tread Softly Stranger received its first DVD release in the UK in 2008.

Box office
Kinematograph Weekly listed it as being "in the money" at the British box office in 1958.

References

External links 
 
 
Tread Softly Stranger at BFI

 
Tread Softly Stranger at British 60s Cinema
Tread Softly Stranger at Letterbox DVD
Tread Softly Stranger at Noir of the Week

1958 films
1958 crime drama films
British black-and-white films
British crime drama films
British heist films
Film noir
Films about brothers
Films about murderers
Films directed by Gordon Parry
Films set in Yorkshire
Films shot in Yorkshire
1950s English-language films
1950s British films